The Daintree Rainforest is a region on the northeast coast of Queensland, Australia, north of Mossman and Cairns. The Daintree Rainforest is a part of the Wet Tropics of Queensland Rainforest, that spans across the Cairns Region. The Wet Tropics Rainforest (that the Daintree is a part of) is the oldest continually surviving tropical rainforest in the world. Along the coastline north of the Daintree River, tropical forest grows right down to the edge of the sea.

In 2009 as part of the Q150 celebrations, the Daintree Rainforest was announced as one of the Q150 Icons of Queensland for its role as a "natural attraction".

History and description

About Daintree Rainforest

The Daintree Rainforest was once a vast forest that covered the entire Australian continent. It is a rare survival of 120 million years of climate change, which has reduced the forest to few remaining areas of the continent.

The rainforest is named after Richard Daintree, an Australian geologist and photographer (1832–1878).

The area includes the Daintree National Park, some areas of State Forest, and some privately owned land, including a residential community. Some of the privately owned land north of the Peninsula Range is being progressively purchased for conservation purposes under a $15 million government scheme involving equal contributions from the municipal (Cairns Regional Council), which includes the former Douglas Shire council), State (Queensland) and Australian Federal governments. As of May 2011, 72% of the properties earmarked for buyback or compensation had been secured. These 'buyback' areas of tropical rainforest included 215 blocks of land purchased by the Queensland Parks and Wildlife Service, and 13 purchased by private conservation agencies.

The Daintree Rainforest contains 30% of the frog, reptile and marsupial species in Australia, and 90% of Australia's bat and butterfly species. 7% of bird species in the country can be found in this area. There are also over 12,000 species of insects in the rainforest. All of this diversity is contained within an area that takes up 0.12% of the landmass of Australia. Part of the forest is protected by the Daintree National Park and drained by the Daintree River. The roads north of the river wind through areas of lush forest, and have been designed to minimize impacts on this ancient ecosystem.

On 29 September 2021, the Eastern Kuku Yalanji people won formal ownership of 160,213 hectares of country stretching from Mossman to Cooktown, including the Daintree National Park after a historic deal was made between the traditional custodians and the Queensland Government.

Exploring

The Daintree region combines tropical rainforest, white sandy beaches, and fringing reefs just offshore, which is a rare combination. Due to the distance between attractions, driving is often the simplest way to navigate between them. The Daintree National Park boasts many walking tracks and there are a number of accommodation options within the Daintree Rainforest itself.

To the west of Cape Tribulation stands Mt Pieter Botte with its massive granite outcrops. The summit providing expansive vistas of undisturbed forest and to the south, the skyline is dominated by the giant granite boulders of Thornton Peak – one of Queensland's highest mountains.

Much of the Daintree Rainforest is part of the Wet Tropics of Queensland World Heritage Site, being listed by UNESCO in 1988 in recognition of its universal natural values highlighted by the rainforest.  Blockades against road building through the rainforest occurred in 1983 and 1984 and were followed by a major lobbying campaign which eventually secured protection for the area.

Amongst the attributes provided as evidence for the World Heritage value of the Wet Tropics, which include the Daintree Rainforest, the Australian Government lists the following:

They preserve major stages of the earth's evolutionary history -
 ancient plants representing some of the earliest land plants, the Psilotopsida (whisk ferns) and the Lycopsida (club mosses or tassel ferns);
 7 ancient families of true ferns, including the Marattiaceae (giant or king ferns), Osmundaceae (royal ferns), Schizaeaceae (comb ferns) and Gleicheniaceae (coral ferns);
 fern genera of East Gondwanan origins, including Polystichum (shield ferns), Leptopteris, Todea, Tmesipteris (fork ferns), Lycopodiella and Huperzia (club mosses and tassel ferns);
 the ancient, fern-like cycad Bowenia spectabilis (zamia fern) and other cycads including Cycas, and the giant Lepidozamia hopei (zamia palm);
 ancient conifers such as Podocarpus (plum pine or brown pine), Prumnopitys (brown pine or southern yew), Araucaria (hoop and bunya pines), and Agathis (kauri) which are living counterparts of Jurassic-age fossils (i.e., age of the dinosaurs);
 12 primitive angiosperm (flowering plant) families, including small, primitive, relict angiosperm families such as Austrobaileyaceae, Idiospermaceae, Eupomatiaceae and Himantandraceae;
 relict angiosperm plant families that are known as fossils from the Cretaceous (last age of the dinosaurs) including Cunoniaceae, Proteaceae (banksia and macadamia family), Winteraceae, Myrtaceae (eucalypt and lilly pilly), Monimiaceae, Rutaceae, Sapindaceae, Aquifoliaceae (holly family), Chloranthaceae, Trimeniaceae, Epacridaceae (heath family), Olacaceae and families of angiosperms to represent the longest continuous history associated with the Gondwanan landmass.

They preserve unique, rare or superlative natural phenomena, formations or features of exceptional natural beauty –
 exceptional coastal scenery unusual in the world (and Australia) where tropical rainforest extends to white sandy beaches with fringing coral reefs just offshore;
 rugged mountain peaks and gorges with swiftly flowing rivers and spectacular waterfalls (e.g., Thornton Peak, Mossman Gorge, Roaring Meg Falls);
 extensive vistas of undisturbed forest and valleys.

The Daintree rainforest contains important and significant habitats for conservation of biological diversity. Approximately 430 species of birds live among the trees. The primitive flowering plants Austrobaileya scandens and Idiospermum australiense are also endemic to the Daintree. However, The Daintree Region is home to a number of rare and endangered species, including the southern cassowary (Casuarius Casuarius) and Bennett's tree-kangaroo (Dendrolagus bennettianus).

Daintree Important Bird Area
The Daintree Important Bird Area (IBA) is a  tract of land that largely coincides with the northernmost part of the Wet Tropics of Queensland World Heritage Site. It encompasses, or overlaps, the Kalkajaka, Ngalba Bulal, Daintree, Mount Windsor and Mowbray National Parks.

It has been identified as an IBA by BirdLife International because it supports a population of southern cassowaries. It also contains populations of the locally endemic tooth-billed and golden bowerbirds, lovely fairywrens, Macleay's, bridled, yellow-spotted and white-streaked honeyeaters, fernwrens, Atherton scrubwrens, mountain thornbills, chowchillas, Bower's shrike-thrushes, pied monarchs, Victoria's riflebirds and pale-yellow robins.

See also

 Cape York Peninsula
 Forests of Australia
 Queensland tropical rain forests

References

External links

 Daintree Visitors Guide
 Visitor information about the Daintree
 Summary of the Daintree Rainforest
Bugs & Butterflies of The Daintree

Landforms of Far North Queensland
Forests of Queensland
Tropical rainforests of Australia
Important Bird Areas of Queensland
Tourist attractions in Far North Queensland